The 1932–33 Northern Rugby Football League season was the 38th season of rugby league football. Salford won their second Rugby Football League Championship when they beat Swinton 15-5 in the play-off final. They had also finished the regular season as league leaders. The Challenge Cup winners were Huddersfield who beat Warrington 21-17 in the final. Salford won the Lancashire League, and Castleford won the Yorkshire League. Warrington beat St.Helens 10–9 to win the Lancashire Cup, and Leeds beat Wakefield Trinity 8–0 to win the Yorkshire Cup. This season, Widnes' Jimmy Hoey became rugby league's first player to play and score in every one of his club's matches in an entire season.

Championship

Play-off

Challenge Cup

Huddersfield beat Warrington 21-17 in the final at Wembley before a crowd of 41,784. This was Huddersfield’s fourth Cup Final win in as many Cup Final appearances, and they became the first team to win the trophy more than three times. This was also the fifth Cup Final defeat for Warrington.

References

Sources
1932-33 Rugby Football League season at wigan.rlfans.com
The Challenge Cup at The Rugby Football League website

Northern Rugby Football League seasons
Northern Rugby Football League season
Northern Rugby Football League season